The Twinkler is a 1916 American silent crime drama film directed by Edward Sloman. The film stars William Russell and Charlotte Burton. The author, Henry Leverage, was incarcerated in Sing Sing for auto theft; that fact was used in the film's marketing.

Cast
 William Russell as Bob Stephany
 Charlotte Burton as Rose Burke
 Clarence Burton as Boss Corregan
 William A. Carroll as Daddy Burke
 William Tedmarsh
 William Spencer
 Robert Klein
 Orinel Barney

External links

1916 films
1916 crime drama films
American crime drama films
American silent feature films
American black-and-white films
Films directed by Edward Sloman
1910s American films
Silent American drama films
1910s English-language films